The 1980 Chicago Marathon was the 4th running of the annual marathon race in Chicago, United States and was held on September 28. The elite men's and women's races were won by Americans Frank Richardson (2:14:04 hours) and Sue Petersen (2:45:03). A total of 3624 runners finished the race, an increase of over 750 from the previous year.

Results

Men

Women

References

Results. Association of Road Racing Statisticians. Retrieved 2020-05-25.
Chicago Marathon Year-By-Year. Chicago Marathon. Retrieved 2020-05-26.

External links 
 Official website

1980
Chicago
1980 in Illinois
1980s in Chicago
Chicago Marathon
Chicago Marathon